The 2008–09 Pittsburgh Panthers women's basketball team represented the University of Pittsburgh in the 2008–09 NCAA Division I women's basketball season and advanced to the NCAA Tournament "Sweet 16". The Panthers were coached by Agnus Berenato. The Panthers are a member of the Big East Conference and played their home games at the Petersen Events Center in Pittsburgh, Pennsylvania.

Previous season
The 2007-08 Pitt women's basketball went 24-10, tying a program record number of wins set the previous season. Pitt earned its first ever bid to the NCAA women's basketball tournament advancing to the second round where it lost to eventual national champion Tennessee. Pitt finished the season ranked #16 in the Coaches' Poll, its highest finish in the polls for the women up until that point. Center Marcedes Walker and Guards Karlyle Lim and Mallorie Winn finish up their eligibility.

Offseason
Agnus Berenato is honored as the Dapper Dan Sportswomen of the Year for 2008-09.
Marcedes Walker earns a spot on the WNBA's Houston Comets's roster
Pitt hired assistant coach Yolett McPhee-McCuin from the University of Portland to replace departed assistant coach Shea Ralph, who took a position at her alma mater Connecticut.
The Pitt women's team took a preseason trip to Europe to play three exhibitions games
Shavonte Zellous is named to the State Farm Wade Trophy "Watch List"
Seven of the women's team's games are picked up for television, including two appearances on ESPN2
Former center Marcedes Walker's jersey is selected to hang in the "Ring of Honor" at the Women's Basketball Hall of Fame.
Shavonte Zellous is named to the preseason All-American teams of Lindy's and the Sporting News.
Agnus Berenato's contract is extended to coach the University of Pittsburgh through the 2015-16 season.
Shavonte Zellous is a unanimous selection to the pre-season All-Big East team.
Shavonte Zellous is named as one of 30 candidates for the John R. Wooden Award.
Shavonte Zellous, alongside DeJuan Blair of the Pitt men's team, appears on one of six covers of the Sports Illustrated College Basketball Preview Issue.

Roster

*Injured during the first regular season game against Texas A&M and was redshirted.

Schedule and results

Rankings

Team players drafted into the WNBA

See also
Pittsburgh Panthers women's basketball
Pittsburgh Panthers men's basketball
2008–09 Pittsburgh Panthers men's basketball team
Pittsburgh Panthers
University of Pittsburgh
Big East Conference

References

External links
Official Site 

Pittsburgh Panthers women's basketball seasons
Pittsburgh
Pittsburgh